Ted O'Mahony (born 1940) is an Irish retired hurler. He played hurling at club level with Cloughduv and at inter-county level as a member of the Cork senior hurling team.

Honours

Cork
All-Ireland Senior Hurling Championship (1): 1966
Munster Senior Hurling Championship (1): 1966

References

1940 births
Living people
Cloughduv hurlers
Cork inter-county hurlers